Xavier Pascual may refer to:
Xavier Pascual Fuertes (born 1968), Spanish former handballer and handball coach.
Xavi Pascual (basketball) (born 1972), Spanish basketball coach.